Craigballyharky (Irish: Rocky Craggy Townland) is a large hill in the south-west of the townland of Cookstown, County Tyrone, Northern Ireland.

Geology
The rock is a tonalite, which shares its name with the landform has yielded a 471 +2/-4 Ma U-Pb zircon age (Hutton et al. 1985).

References

Mountains and hills of County Tyrone